Gaston Gourde (born 17 March 1950 in Saint-Isidore, Quebec) was a Liberal party member of the House of Commons of Canada. He was a lawyer by career.

Gourde represented the Lévis, Quebec electoral district after winning a 4 May 1981 by-election. He served the latter part of the 32nd Canadian Parliament until he was defeated in 1984 federal election by Gabriel Fontaine of the Progressive Conservative party. Gourde attempted a political comeback in the 2011 federal election unsuccessfully running for the Bloc Québécois in the riding of Lotbinière—Chutes-de-la-Chaudière.

Electoral record

External links
 

1950 births
Living people
Members of the House of Commons of Canada from Quebec
Liberal Party of Canada MPs
Bloc Québécois candidates for the Canadian House of Commons
Candidates in the 2011 Canadian federal election